Kureinji is an extinct language of southwest New South Wales. It is also called  Keramin and Kemendok, though it is not clear if these are dialects or synonyms.

Keramin is also spelled Karin, Kerinma, Karinma, Karingma, Keramin; other names are Orangema, Pintwa.

Horgen suggests that Yerreyerre is another name for Keramin, but this name may refer to other languages.

References

Lower Murray languages